Anglo (foaled 1958) was an Irish-bred Thoroughbred racehorse who competed in National Hunt racing.

He is best known for winning the 1966 Grand National comfortably by 20 lengths despite being a newcomer and an outsider as well as being ridden by a jockey, Tim Norman, who had been in a bad traffic accident the day before the race.

Background
Anglo was an Irish-bred chestnut sired by Greek Star out of Miss Alligator and was originally named Flag of Convenience. At two years old he started on Flats.

Racing career
Under the training of Ryan Price, Anglo went from strength to strength winning over hurdles and winning four successive wins in novice chases. However, Price was banned from training and so Anglo came under the wing of Fred Winter.

Winter wanted Anglo to race in the Grand National but the horse had a lacklustre year with only one win at Windsor and poor form. As such he entered the 1966 Grand National as a 50/1 outsider.

To make matters worse his original jockey, Eddie Harty, was injured on the day and so jockey Tim Norman was forced to ride despite having been involved in a serious traffic accident the day before.

The race was steady with all riders staying in until The Chair fence after which riders began to drop off leading to Anglo advancing up the field and catching up with leader Forest Prince before Anglo's superior stamina allowed him to push on as Forest Prince faded. Anglo won the race with a remarkable 20 length victory.

The following season, in preparation for the 1967 Grand National, Anglo managed to win a small race at Worcester which saw him start the National as joint fourth favourite under jockey Bobby Beasley.

From the start he had a poor race and soon tailed away before pulling up at fence 15. After this dismal performance he only raced for one more season, failing to win in five starts including being pulled up in the Hennessy Cognac Gold Cup. His last race was at Lingfield in February 1968 after which he was retired.

Grand National record

Pedigree

References

1958 racehorse births
Racehorses bred in Ireland
Racehorses trained in the United Kingdom
Grand National winners